G 9-38, also known as EI Cancri and GJ 1116, is a binary star system consisting of two M-type stars. At 16.7 light-years from the Sun, the system is relatively nearby. The system has a very high stellar flare activity, with average five flares per hour.

In 2015, the search for third star in the system has yielded inconclusive results.

References

 Table with parallaxes.

Cancer (constellation)
Binary stars
M-type main-sequence stars
1116
Cancri, EI
J08581519+1945470
Flare stars